Nirmala College, Ranchi, is a general degree college in the Jharkhand state of India. This is a Christian Minority Institution, founded in August 1969 by the Society of Sisters of Charity of Jesus and Mary. It offers intermediate and degree courses in arts and sciences. It is affiliated to  Ranchi University.

See also
Education in India
Ranchi University
Literacy in India
List of institutions of higher education in Jharkhand

References

External links
 http://www.nirmalacollegeranchi.com/

Colleges affiliated to Ranchi University
Educational institutions established in 1969
Universities and colleges in Ranchi
Universities and colleges in Jharkhand
1969 establishments in Bihar